Frontove (Russian: Фронтовое, Ukrainian: Фронтове, Crimean Tatar: Qoy Asan)  is a Russian village in the district of Lenine Raion in Crimea, Russia. It appears in English-language histories of the Battle of Kerch Peninsula as Koi-Asan.

Geography 
Frontove  is located to the north of Feodosia, west of the Kerch Peninsula. The North Crimean Canal passes to the south of the village, with the Frontove Reservoir located directly south-east.

References 

Villages in Crimea